Environmental issues in Afghanistan predate the political turmoil of the past few decades. Forests have been depleted by centuries of grazing and farming, practices which have only increased with modern population growth. In Afghanistan, environmental conservation and economic concerns are not at odds; with over 44% of the population dependent on herding or farming, the welfare of the environment is critical to the economic welfare of the people. In 2007, the World Health Organization released a report ranking Afghanistan as the lowest among non-African nations in deaths from environmental hazards.

Climate change

Deforestation

Felling is illegal all over the country. According to a 2010 report, only about 2.1% (or 1,350,000 ha) of Afghanistan is forested. Some steps have been taken in recent years in planting trees in the urban areas across Afghanistan. Even the Taliban spiritual leader has recently called for planting more trees. Afghanistan had a Forest Landscape Integrity Index mean score of 8.85/10, ranking it 15th globally out of 172 countries.

Afghans have historically depended on forests for firewood and the revenue generated by export of pistachios and almonds, which grow in natural woodlands in the central and northern regions. The Badghis and Takhar provinces have lost more than 50% of pistachio woodland. In the past many have used wood for fuel, and those such as the Northern Alliance have cleared trees which could have provided hiding places for ambushes from the Taliban. Further, the use of the woodlands for grazing ground and the collection of nuts for export apparently prevent new pistachio trees from growing.

Afghanistan has lost nearly half of its forests. Denser forests in the eastern Nangarhar, Kunar, Nuristan and other provinces are at risk from timber harvesting by timber mafia. Although the logging is illegal, profits from exporting the timber to neighboring Pakistan are very high. The reason for this is that Pakistani government has its forests tightly protected so the timber mafia are busy cutting down trees in Afghanistan instead. The timber makes its way not only to Peshawar but also to Islamabad, Rawalpindi, and Lahore, where most of it is used to make expensive furniture. The Afghan government has formed special park rangers to monitor and stop these activities.

As forest cover decrease, the land becomes less and less productive, threatening the livelihood of the rural population and the floods are washing the agricultural lands and destroying the houses. Loss of vegetation also creates a higher risk of floods, which not only endanger the people, but cause soil erosion and decrease the amount of land available for agriculture. To reverse this destruction, MAIL is attempting to turn Afghanistan green again by planting millions of trees every spring, particularly on the 10th of March, which is recognized as national tree plantation day in the country.

Wildlife

Hunting is illegal in Afghanistan because much of the country's wildlife is at risk of being extinct. In 2014 around 5,000 birds were smuggled out of Afghanistan, which included falcons, hawks and geese. In 2006, Afghanistan and the Wildlife Conservation Society began a three-year project to protect wildlife and habitats in Band-e Amir National Park and Wakhan National Park.

Endangered species
 Asian black bear (Ursus thibetanus)
 Falcon
 Houbara bustard (Chlamydotis undulata)
 Marco Polo sheep (Ovis ammon polii)
 Markhor (Capra falconeri)
 Siberian crane (Grus leucogeranus)
 Snow leopard (Uncia uncia)
 Urial (Ovis orientalis)
 Wild goat (Capra aegagrus)

Critically endangered species
 Corn crake (Crex crex)
 Eastern imperial eagle (Aquilla heliaca)
 Greater spotted eagle (Aquilla clanga)
 Lesser kestrel (Falco naumanni)
 Marbled duck (Marmaronetta angustirostris)
 Pallas's fish eagle (Haliaeetus leucoryphus)
 Sociable lapwing (Vanellus gregaria)
 White-headed duck (Oxyura leucocephala)
 Yellow-eyed pigeon (Columba hodgsonii)

Little is known about the status of the salamander Batrachuperus mustersi, which is found only in the Hindu Kush.

Water management

Most of Afghanistan's fresh water flow by fast-flowing rivers into neighboring countries. This naturally benefits those countries but not Afghanistan. The primary threat to Afghanistan's water supply is the droughts, which have created food shortages for millions of Afghans in the past. The resulting agricultural crises between 1995 and 2001 have driven many thousands of families from rural to urban areas. 
In response to drought, deep wells for irrigation have been drilled which decreased the under ground water level, further draining groundwater resources, which rely on rain for replenishment. 

According to UNICEF, only around 67% of the population of Afghanistan has access to clean drinking water. This number is expected to steadily increase in the future, especially in Kabul after the Shah wa Arus and Shahtoot dams are completed. The major organizations helping Afghanistan better manage its water resources are Indian and German.

Between 1998 and 2003, about 99% of the Sistan wetlands were dry, another result of continued drought and lack of water management. The wetlands, an important habitat for breeding and migrant waterfowl including the dalmatian pelican and the marbled teal, have provided water for agricultural irrigation for at least 5,000 years. They are fed by the Helmand and Farah rivers, which ran at 98% below average in drought years between 2001 and 2003. As in other areas of the country, the loss of natural vegetation resulted in soil erosion; here, sandstorms submerged as many as 100 villages by 2003.

Some of the major water reservoirs and dams include the following:
Band-e Amir in Bamyan Province
Dahla Dam in Kandahar Province
Darunta Dam in Nangarhar Province
Kajaki Dam in Helmand Province
Kamal Khan Dam in Nimruz Province
Naghlu Dam in Kabul Province
Qargha Reservoir in Kabul Province
Salma Dam (Afghan-India Friendship Dam) in Herat Province
Sardeh Dam between Ghazni Province and Paktika Province

Pollution

Since 2002, over 5 million Afghan citizens living in Pakistan and Iran have returned to Afghanistan. Many of them settled in the big cities, particularly in Kabul, Kandahar, Herat, Mazar-i-Sharif and Jalalabad.

Air pollution
Air pollution in Afghanistan's major cities is becoming a serious problem to public health. Residents of Kabul suffer the most from air pollution. Over 2,000 Kabul residents die from air pollution each year. Large number of vehicles in the city is the main reason for this.

Nationally, an estimated 5,000 people die from air pollution. Some sources have given a much higher number of deaths in the past. Vehicles are also blamed for the air pollution in the other cities.

Domestic and industrial waste
Afghanistan has long lacked a proper sewage system. In 2002, the United Nations Environment Programme found that a lack of waste management systems was creating dangerous conditions in several urban areas. In Kabul's districts 5 and 6, household and medical waste was discarded on streets. Human waste was contained in open sewers, which flowed into the Kabul River and contaminated the city's drinking water.

Urban dumpsites have been used in lieu of managed landfills in Kabul, Kandahar and Herat, often without protection of nearby rivers and groundwater supplies. Medical waste from hospitals is sometimes disposed in the dumpsites with the rest of the cities' waste, contaminating water and air with bacteria and viruses.

Lack of sewage management is not unique to Kabul. In urban areas, open sewers are common while wastewater treatment is not. Much of the urban water supply is contaminated by Escherichia coli and other bacteria.

Oil refineries are another source of water contamination. In Herat and Mazar-i-Sharif, crude oil spills and leaks are uncontained and unsafe levels of hydrocarbons reach residential water supplies.

Nuclear waste by Pakistan
In 2008, the Afghan government stated that it was investigating allegation that Pakistan had dumped nuclear waste in southern Afghanistan during the Taliban rule in the late 1990s.

See also
 Environmental impacts of war in Afghanistan
 Geography of Afghanistan
 Health in Afghanistan

References

External links

Issues
Health in Afghanistan
Afghanistan